Wayne Harvey Fawbush (born March 17, 1944) is an American politician who served as a member of the Oregon House of Representatives and Oregon State Senate.

Early life and education 
Fawbush was born in Hood River, Oregon. He graduated from the University of Oregon.

Career 
Fawbush owned and operated a commercial farm in Hood River, Oregon where he grew pears and blueberries. He served with the United States Air Force during the Vietnam War. During the Clinton administration, he was a member of the Senior Executive Service assigned as Deputy for Program Operations for the Farmers Home Administration at the United States Department of Agriculture. He served as the first director of the Vermont Sustainable Jobs Fund. He was also a program officer at the Ford Foundation.

References

1944 births
Living people
Democratic Party members of the Oregon House of Representatives
Democratic Party Oregon state senators
University of Oregon alumni
Farmers from Oregon
United States Department of Agriculture officials
United States Air Force personnel of the Vietnam War
People from Hood River, Oregon
United States Air Force officers
Military personnel from Oregon